The 1972 NAIA Division II football season was the 17th season of college football sponsored by the NAIA and the third season of play of the NAIA's lower division for football.

The season was played from August to November 1972 and culminated in the 1972 NAIA Division II Football National Championship, played on December 9, 1972, in Joplin, Missouri on the campus of Missouri Southern State College.

Missouri Southern defeated  in the championship game, 21–14, to win their first NAIA national title. As of 2015, this was the earliest championship to feature a team that remains a NAIA member.

Conference standings

Postseason

See also
 1972 NAIA Division I football season
 1972 NCAA University Division football season
 1972 NCAA College Division football season

References

 
NAIA Football National Championship